Rodrigo Emanuel Cecchini (born 24 December 1996) is an Argentine footballer who plays as a midfielder for Gimnasia LP.

Club career

Banfield
Born in Ingeniero Luis A. Huergo, Río Negro Province, Cecchini joined Banfield's youth setup in 2010, from CSyD Huergo. On 14 June 2013, he made his first team debut at the age of 16, coming on as a late substitute in a 4–2 away win against Defensa y Justicia in the Primera B Nacional.

Cecchini subsequently returned to the youth setup, only appearing once on the bench during the 2013–14 season as his side achieved promotion to the Primera División. He made his debut in the category on 21 February 2015, replacing Nicolás Bertolo in a 4–1 defeat of Atlético de Rafaela.

Cecchini became a regular starter under Julio César Falcioni during the 2016–17 campaign, and scored his first goal on 2 October 2016 by netting the winner in a 3–2 home success over San Martín de San Juan.

Málaga
On 27 July 2017, Cecchini signed a five-year deal with La Liga club Málaga CF. He made his debut on 15 October, replacing Paul Baysse late into a 0–2 home loss against CD Leganés.

On 28 December 2017, Cecchini was loaned to Mexican Club León for the next six months without a buying option. After appearing in only 63 minutes for the club, he returned to Banfield the following 25 June, also in a temporary deal.

On 8 August 2019, Cecchini was loaned to Seattle Sounders FC of Major League Soccer (MLS) on the last day of the league's summer transfer window. After again appearing rarely, he joined Unión de Santa Fe also in a temporary deal.

Cecchini was one of the eight first-team players released by Málaga on 3 October 2020, due to a layoff; his loan, however, is maintained until its expiration (January 2021), with the player being officially released afterwards.

Gimnasia La Plate
On 18 February 2021, Cecchini joined Gimnasia LP, signing a deal until the end of 2021. On 7 January 2022, Cecchini signed a new contract with the club until the end of the year.

Honours
Seattle Sounders FC
 MLS Cup:  2019

References

External links

1996 births
Living people
People from Ingeniero Luis A. Huergo
Argentine people of Italian descent
Argentine footballers
Argentine expatriate footballers
Association football midfielders
Club Atlético Banfield footballers
Málaga CF players
Seattle Sounders FC players
Club León footballers
Unión de Santa Fe footballers
Club de Gimnasia y Esgrima La Plata footballers
Unión Española footballers
Liga MX players
La Liga players
Primera Nacional players
Argentine Primera División players
Chilean Primera División players
Major League Soccer players
Argentine expatriate sportspeople in Spain
Argentine expatriate sportspeople in Mexico
Argentine expatriate sportspeople in the United States
Expatriate footballers in Chile
Expatriate footballers in Spain
Expatriate footballers in Mexico
Expatriate soccer players in the United States